The men's long jump event at the 1978 Commonwealth Games was held on 8 and 10 August at the Commonwealth Stadium in Edmonton, Alberta, Canada.

Medalists

Results

Qualification
Held on 8 August

Final
Held on 10 August

References

Final results (The Canberra Times)
Australian results

Athletics at the 1978 Commonwealth Games
1978